John Elgee (1754–1824) was Archdeacon of Leighlin from 1804 until his death.

He was educated at Trinity College, Dublin. His whole career was spent at St Iberius, Wexford;  from 1790 to 1794 as Curate and from 1795 as rector. During the Irish Rebellion of 1798 he was saved from certain death because of his previous humanitarian treatment of the poor.

His grandson, Robert McClure, was an Arctic explorer; and his granddaughter, Jane Wilde, was the mother of Oscar Wilde.

References

Archdeacons of Leighlin
Alumni of Trinity College Dublin
18th-century Irish Anglican priests
19th-century Irish Anglican priests
1754 births
1824 deaths